Ilias Hassani (born 8 November 1995) is an Algerian professional footballer who plays as a centre back.

Career
A youth product of Toulouse, Hassani made his Ligue 1 debut on 11 February 2014 as a 50th-minute substitute, replacing Dany Maury during a 1–3 home defeat against SC Bastia.

On 16 August 2016, Hassani signed a one-year contract with Bulgarian club Vereya Stara Zagora, where he made 23 league appearances during the 2016–17 season.

On 15 June 2017, Hassani moved to fellow First League club Cherno More Varna. On 15 July, he made his debut in a 1–0 home win over Vitosha Bistritsa. On 28 July 2017, he scored his first career goal in a 1–0 home win over Dunav Ruse, a stunning run into the box followed by a left-footed shot from a small angle. In July 2020, Hassani joined Beroe Stara Zagora.

International career
On 2 September 2017, Hassani made his debut for Algeria in а 1–3 away defeat by Zambia, a 2018 FIFA World Cup qualifier.

Career statistics

References

External links
 

1995 births
Living people
People from Cholet
Association football defenders
Algerian footballers
Algeria international footballers
French footballers
France youth international footballers
Ligue 1 players
First Professional Football League (Bulgaria) players
Qatar Stars League players
Qatari Second Division players
Toulouse FC players
FC Girondins de Bordeaux players
FC Vereya players
PFC Cherno More Varna players
Al-Gharafa SC players
Al Kharaitiyat SC players
FC Arda Kardzhali players
PFC Beroe Stara Zagora players
Al-Shahania SC players
Algerian expatriate footballers
Algerian expatriate sportspeople in Bulgaria
Algerian expatriate sportspeople in Qatar
Expatriate footballers in Bulgaria
Expatriate footballers in Qatar
French sportspeople of Algerian descent
Sportspeople from Maine-et-Loire
Footballers from Pays de la Loire